This is a list of trestle bridges.  

The United States once had many; now some survive and are listed on the National Register of Historic Places (NRHP).

These include:
in the United States
Sulphur Trestle Fort Site, Elkmont, Alabama, NRHP-listed
St. Francis River Bridge (Lake City, Arkansas)
West James Street Overpass (1924), Redfield, Arkansas
Warrens Bridge (c. 1930), Arkansas
Clio Trestle, California
Dumbarton Rail Bridge, California
Richmond–San Rafael Bridge, California
San Mateo–Hayward Bridge, California
San Luis Southern Railway Trestle, Blanca, Colorado, NRHP-listed
D & RG Narrow Gauge Trestle, Cimarron, Colorado, NRHP-listed
Doe Run Trestle, Springfield, Kentucky, NRHP-listed
Chacahoula Swamp Bridge (1995), Louisiana
Lake Pontchartrain Causeway, Louisiana
CNR Bonnet Carré Spillway-McComb Bridge, Louisiana
Louisiana Highway 1 Bridge, Louisiana
U.S. 61 Bonnet Carré Spillway Bridge, Louisiana
Baltimore & Ohio Railroad Bridge, Antietam Creek, Maryland
Verrazano Bridge (Maryland)
Minnesota and International Railway Trestle at Blackduck (1901-02), Minnesota
Adamson Bridge (1916), Cherry County, Nebraska, timber stringer trestle bridge built by the Canton Bridge Co.  Formerly NRHP-listed.
CRRNJ Newark Bay Bridge, New Jersey
Bridge A 249, New Mexico
Mexican Canyon Trestle, Cloudcroft, New Mexico, NRHP-listed
Wills Canyon Spur Trestle, Cloudcroft, New Mexico, NRHP-listed
Union Street Railroad Bridge and Trestle, near Salem, Oregon, NRHP-listed
Delta Trestle Bridge, Maryland and Pennsylvania Railroad, Delta, Pennsylvania, NRHP-listed
Southern Pacific Railroad: Ogden-Lucin Cut-Off Trestle, Ogden, Utah, NRHP-listed
Arboretum Sewer Trestle (1910), Seattle, Washington, NRHP-listed
Wilburton Trestle (1904), Washington
Chesapeake Bay Bridge–Tunnel
Dale Creek Crossing
Fairfax Bridge (Washington)
Genesee Arch Bridge
Hampton Roads Bridge–Tunnel
Hoover-Mason Trestle
I-10 Bonnet Carré Spillway Bridge
I-10 Twin Span Bridge
Kinzua Bridge
LaBranche Wetlands Bridge
Lewisville Lake Toll Bridge
Little Pipe Creek bridge and viaduct
Lucin Cutoff
Lyman Viaduct
Magnolia Bridge
Manchac Swamp Bridge
Maroon Creek Bridge
Merrill P. Barber Bridge
Monitor–Merrimac Memorial Bridge–Tunnel
Moodna Viaduct
Norfolk Southern Lake Pontchartrain Bridge
Old Youngs Bay Bridge
Peninsula Subdivision Trestle
Pleasure Beach Bridge
Porter Hollow Embankment and Culvert
Rapallo Viaduct
Rivanna Subdivision Trestle
Robert Moses Causeway
Rock Island Railroad Bridge (Columbia River)
Rosendale Trestle
Safe Harbor Bridge
Salisbury Viaduct
Santa Fe Arroyo Seco Railroad Bridge
State Highway 274 Bridge
Susitna River Bridge
Transcontinental Railroad Grade
Trestles Bridge
Triple Crossing
Tulip Viaduct

References

Historic sites in progress

Trestle